Đặng Thị Ngọc Thịnh (born 25 December 1959) is a Vietnamese politician who served as Acting President of Vietnam in 2018 and as the Vice President of Vietnam from 2016 to 2021. She is the first woman in Vietnamese history to hold the Vietnamese presidency and the first female head of state in a communist country since Soong Ching-ling of China. 

Thịnh was elected Vice President of Vietnam on 8 April 2016 after winning 91.09% of the vote (450 votes) in the National Assembly, continuing the recent norm of having a woman holding this position. Thịnh assumed the acting presidency upon the death of President Trần Đại Quang on 21 September 2018 until the election and swearing-in of Nguyễn Phú Trọng on 23 October 2018. 

Prior to national politics, Thịnh served in the municipal bureaucracy of Ho Chi Minh City before being elected Secretary of Vĩnh Long Provincial Party Committee (de facto province's leader) in 2010. She was a member of the 11th and 13th sessions of the National Assembly. Thịnh became a member of the Communist Party of Vietnam on 19 November 1979.

Her previous works focused on promoting gender equality and women's empowerment by strengthening their role in all aspects of economic, political, cultural and social life.

In January 2021, at the 13th National Party Congress, she was not on the list of members of the new Party Central Committee. She retired from politics in April 2021.

See also
 List of elected and appointed female heads of state and government

References

|-

1959 births
Living people
Vice presidents of Vietnam
Alternates of the 10th Central Committee of the Communist Party of Vietnam
Members of the 11th Central Committee of the Communist Party of Vietnam
20th-century Vietnamese women politicians
20th-century Vietnamese politicians
Members of the National Assembly (Vietnam)
People from Quảng Nam province
Women vice presidents
Presidents of Vietnam
Female heads of state
Women presidents
21st-century Vietnamese women politicians
21st-century Vietnamese politicians